Back to God's Country is a 1927 silent film Northwoods adventure based on James Oliver Curwood's story Wapi, the Walrus. The film was directed by Irvin Willat and stars Renée Adorée, usually an MGM actress. The film is a remake of the 1919 film Back to God's Country which starred Nell Shipman.

The film survives today.

Cast
Renée Adorée as Renee DeBois
Robert Frazer as Bob Stanton
Walter Long as Captain Blake
Mitchell Lewis as Jean DeBois
Adolph Milar as Frenchie Leblanc
James Mason as Jacques Corbeau
Walter Ackerman as Clerk
Flying Eagle as Indian

References

External links

allmovie/synopsis
lobby poster...#2 lobby poster

1927 films
American silent feature films
Universal Pictures films
Films directed by Irvin Willat
Films based on short fiction
Remakes of American films
American black-and-white films
1920s adventure drama films
American adventure drama films
American remakes of Canadian films
1927 drama films
Films based on works by James Oliver Curwood
1920s American films
Silent American drama films
Silent adventure films